The Beruas Museum is a museum in Beruas, Manjung District, Perak, Malaysia. The goal of the Beruas Museum is to collect history and artifacts related to the lost kingdom of Ganga Negara and Beruas.

History
In 1991, a historical study was conducted in Beruas by the Beruas Historical Survey Project. In 1995, the museum building was handed over to Perak State Government and it was opened in July the same year.

Architecture
The museum is housed in a former courthouse.

Exhibitions
The museum exhibits various treasures of the ancient government of Gangga Negara and Beruas, such as illustration maps and notes about its past. It includes around 300 artifacts from the old kingdom.

See also
 List of museums in Malaysia
 List of tourist attractions in Perak

References

1995 establishments in Malaysia
Manjung District
Museums established in 1995
Museums in Perak